is an eight-minute original net animation produced by Anime International Company, and directed by Takafumi Hoshikawa. Since November 22, 2007, the ONA is available through streaming on the Cho! animelo audiovisual website and the Nico Nico Douga online video service. This was followed by a seven-episode series, with episodes being streamed between May 2, 2008 and May 8, 2009. Additional episodes were released on DVD, one with the DVD version of the single, "Bring Up Love" by Nayuta, and another released with volume 2 of the series. A spin-off manga series by Hiro Tōge was serialized in Media Factory's Comic Flapper magazine between November 2009 and December 2010, with another series, also by Tōge, distributed on mobile phones.

As a romantic school comedy setting, the story focuses on the budding romantic relationship between Kanade and Yukino Sakurai, twin sisters in their second year at an all-girls high school in Tokyo, and the conflict provided by freshman Sakuya Kamiyama's feelings towards Kanade.

Plot
Yukino and Kanade Sakurai, twin sisters and natives from Hokkaido, move together to a student residence in Tokyo to attend high school leaving their younger sister, Shizuku "Shi-chan" alone with their parents. Sakuya Kamiyama, a first year student, seeks out and stalks Kanade, saying that she's in love with her and will do anything to be with her, she pays Yukino with candies in exchange of photos and personal stuff of her sister. Later, Kanade feels that the close relationship between Yukino and her is falling apart because of their lack of spending time due to her schoolwork and Yukino's part-time job.

Characters

Main characters

The younger twin, although generally considered more mature than her sister. She is also somewhat easy to ruffle emotionally, especially by Yukino. She often worries that Yukino is sacrificing herself for her benefit. Kanade is an artist and wants to pursue art studies, however, she understands that it would be difficult to pursue a career in the field and maintain a close relationship with Yukino.

The older twin. She likes snacks and often trades photos of Kanade to Sakuya for them. She is a member of their school's swim team and writes a daily blog about her life. She cares deeply for Kanade and will support her in any way she can.

An extremely wealthy freshman who has an obsessive crush on Kanade. She is prone to stealing Kanade's things for her collection. Despite her overwhelming presence, the twins seem to like her as a friend.

Kanade and Yukino's younger sister who attends middle school, nicknamed Shi-chan. She hates being apart from her sisters. She is a lot more level-headed than her older sisters. She is deeply affected by the actions of Yukino, who she seems to care about more than Kanade. Unlike her sisters, she buries all her emotions deep down without expressing them but they later resurface in various ways, such as her skipping school.

Manga characters
Characters who appear in the two different manga series for the magazine and mobile reading manga service.

Kanade's short-haired classmate, nicknamed . Her parents own a restaurant and she is quite good at cooking. She generally tells off Kanade for her perverted thoughts about Yukino.

Sakuya's classmate and self-proclaimed rival in love for Kanade's affection. However, she secretly loves Sakuya, a fact which is obvious to their other classmates.

Sakuya's classmate and Sakuya and Isako's friends who comes from a white collar family. She is close friends with Masumi and is more perceptive of Isako's love for Sakuya than Masumi.

Sakuya's classmate and Sakuya and Isako's friends who helps out with sports clubs as a substitute player or practice partner, she is close friends with Eri but is not as perceptive as Eri is in reading the romantic moments Isako has for Sakuya.

Media

Anime
On December 5, 2007, Candy Boy was released on DVD along with the limited edition of Korean artist Meilin's Candy Boy CD single. This is the first release from a project called Anime 2.0, in which a single is sold accompanied by an OVA.

A follow-up seven-episode series began streaming on May 2, 2008. The first DVD volume of this new series was released on December 10, 2008. A single by Nayuta called Bring up Love was released on August 13, 2008, the DVD edition of which contains the first EX episode of the series. The second DVD volume was released on June 24, 2009, containing another episode.

Episode list

Music
 "Candy Boy" — Meilin (Original ONA)
 "Koi no Katachi" — Kana (Episodes 1–3)
 "Bring up LOVE" — Nayuta (Episodes 4–6)

Manga
A manga adaptation of the series by Hiro Tōge began serialization in the seinen manga magazine Comic Flapper on November 5, 2009. A spin-off manga also by Tōge, titled Candy Boy 〜Young girls fall in love!〜, follows the lives of Sakuya and her classmates behind the scenes of the main story, was distributed on Flapper Mobile alongside the main story release. Both series were compiled into two tankōbon volumes, released on June 23, 2010 and December 22, 2010 respectively.

References

External links
 Official website 
 Official website (AIC) 
 Official website (Anime 2.0) 
 

2007 anime ONAs
2008 anime ONAs
2009 manga
Anime with original screenplays
Incest in anime and manga
Japanese LGBT-related animated television series
Romantic comedy anime and manga
Seinen manga
School life in anime and manga
Yuri (genre) anime and manga